The Viceroy of Yun-Gui, fully referred to in Chinese as the Governor-General of Yunnan and Guizhou Provinces and the Surrounding Areas Overseeing Military Affairs and Food Production, Director of Civil Affairs, was one of eight regional viceroys in China proper during the Qing dynasty. The Viceroy controlled Yunnan and Guizhou (Kweichow) provinces.

History
The Viceroy of Yun-Gui was created in 1659, during the reign of the Shunzhi Emperor, as a jinglue (經略; military governor) office before it was converted to a Viceroy.

In 1662, during the reign of the Kangxi Emperor, the Viceroy of Yun-Gui split into the Viceroy of Yunnan and Viceroy of Guizhou, which were respectively headquartered in Qujing and Anshun. Two years later, the two viceroys were merged and the headquarters shifted to Guiyang. In 1673, the Kangxi Emperor restored the Viceroy of Yunnan, with its headquarters in Qujing. Between 1673 and 1681, the Revolt of the Three Feudatories broke out in Yunnan, Guangdong and Fujian provinces. The Viceroy of Yun-Gui was restored in 1680.

In 1728, the Yongzheng Emperor put the Viceroy of Yun-Gui in charge of Guangxi Province as well but reversed the changes in 1734. This system lasted until the fall of the Qing dynasty in 1912.

Starting from 1905, during the reign of the Guangxu Emperor, the Viceroy of Yun-Gui concurrently held the appointment of Provincial Governor of Yunnan.

List of Viceroys of Yun-Gui

References

 

History of Guizhou
History of Yunnan